La Passe Football Club is a Seychelles based football club from the island of La Digue. They are playing in the Seychelles League.

Club won Seychelles League five times (2002, 2004, 2005, 2009, 2021–2022).

Current squad

Achievements
Seychelles League
Champions (5): 2002, 2004, 2005, 2009, 2021–2022

CAF competitions record

Notes

 PR: Preliminary round
 1R: First round
 2Q: Second qualifying round
 PO: Play-off round
 GS: Group stage

Football clubs in Seychelles
Association football clubs established in 1992
1992 establishments in Seychelles

Organizations with year of establishment missing